My Shadow is an 1885 poem by Robert Louis Stevenson. Among his most famous poems for children, it appeared in A Child's Garden of Verses in 1885.

Because it is written in iambs that contain seven syllables per line, it is written in iambic heptameter, and can be considered a fourteener.

In popular culture 
In 1885, the poem was disfavored by the British Quarterly Review, preferring Stevenson's other poems including The Hayloft, Farewell to the Farm, and The North-West Passage.

It was included in multiple syllabus textbooks for elementary school teachers, including 1918, 1916, and 1921.

In 1948, former U.S. President Harry S. Truman recalled the lines, "I have a little shadow / That goes in and out with me; / And what can be the use of him / Is more than I can see" to refer to the Republican candidate "running along behind him."

In July 1953, Frances Horwich read the poem on an episode of her NBC children's series Ding Dong School.

References

Wikisource
Poetry by Robert Louis Stevenson
1885 poems